Corky Nelson (February 25, 1939 – November 17, 2014) was an American football player and coach. He is known for his coaching stint at the University of North Texas, but was more successful on the high school level.

Nelson was an all-conference center and linebacker at Texas State University–San Marcos, where he was captain of the 1963 team that went undefeated. He began coaching at the high school level soon after his graduation, first at Alamo Heights High School as an assistant, then at Harlandale High School as head coach. He briefly got into the collegiate ranks as defensive line and linebacker coach at the University of North Texas, but left after one season.

In 1971, Nelson became head coach at John Tyler High School in Tyler, Texas.  In 1973, he guided a Lions team that featured Earl Campbell to a perfect 15–0 season as well as the state championship in the largest classification. Nelson then became defensive coordinator under coach Grant Teaff at Baylor University. In 1982, he was named head coach at North Texas, succeeding Bob Tyler. He was also named the school's athletic director in 1989. Following the 1990 season, his contract was not renewed.

Nelson died on November 17, 2014.

Head coaching record

College

References

1939 births
2014 deaths
American football centers
American football linebackers
Baylor Bears football coaches
Mary Hardin–Baylor Crusaders football coaches
North Texas Mean Green athletic directors
North Texas Mean Green football coaches
Texas State Bobcats football players
High school football coaches in Texas
Jefferson High School (San Antonio, Texas) alumni
Sportspeople from San Antonio
Players of American football from San Antonio